The 2016 International Women's Football Tournament of Manaus (also known as the 2016 Torneio Internacional de Manaus de Futebol Feminino) is an invitational football tournament held every December in Brazil. The 2016 tournament will from December 7–18, 2016.

Tournament rules allow a 23-member roster. Players marked (c) were named as captain for their national squad. Totals for caps and goals, club affiliations, and ages are as of the opening day of the tournament on 7 December 2016.

Squads

Coach:  Emily Lima

Coach: Amelia Valverde

Coach: Antonio Cabrini

Coach: Elena Fomina

References

External links

2016 in women's association football
Torn
2016 squads
Association football women's tournament squads